Bucky and Pepito is a 1959 Western-themed animated television series produced by Sam Singer.

The series is about two young boys. Bucky is an imaginative American child who wears a cowboy hat, and his Mexican friend Pepito is an inventor. Pepito's depiction has been criticized as conforming to racist stereotypes.

The series is partially lost. Any episodes of the series have entered the public domain due to failure to renew the copyright.

Cast
Dal McKennon as Bucky and Pepito

Episodes

Reception 
Two episodes appeared on a compilation DVD of the worst cartoons ever made, and it was described by Harry McCracken as setting "a standard for awfulness that no contemporary TV cartoon has managed to surpass".

References

External links

1950s American animated television series
1960s American animated television series
1959 American television series debuts
1960 American television series endings
1950s Western (genre) television series
1960s Western (genre) television series
American children's animated comedy television series
Animated television series about children
First-run syndicated television programs in the United States